Liong Siang Sie (9 October 1892 – 29 May 1953) was a Dutch rowing coxswain. He competed in the men's eight event at the 1920 Summer Olympics.

References

External links
 

1892 births
1953 deaths
Dutch male rowers
Olympic rowers of the Netherlands
Rowers at the 1920 Summer Olympics
Sportspeople from Makassar
Coxswains (rowing)